Alpha Star Aviation Services is a private charter airline based in Riyadh, Saudi Arabia, operating domestic and international scheduled and charter services. Its main base is King Khalid International Airport. In addition to its airline business, Alpha Star also provides air ambulance servicess.

Fleet

The Alpha Star fleet consists of the following aircraft (as of April 2018):

Alpha Star previously operated the following five additional aircraft, all of which were transferred to Sky Prime Aviation when that airline commenced operations in 2016:

1 further Airbus A319
1 further Airbus A320
1 Airbus A330-200 Prestige
1 Airbus A340-200
1 Airbus A340-600

References

External links
 Alpha Star Aviation

Airlines of Saudi Arabia
Airlines established in 2010
Saudi Arabian companies established in 2010